Hampton East is a suburb in Melbourne, Victoria, Australia, 14 km south-east of Melbourne's Central Business District, located within the City of Bayside local government area. Hampton East recorded a population of 5,069 at the 2021 census.

History

Hampton East is a residential suburb mainly developed during the 1950s. The Post Office opened on 1 September 1947, closed in 1950 and reopened in 1956.

See also
 City of Moorabbin – Hampton East was previously within this former local government area.

Notable People from Hampton East
Lil Bite - rapper

References

External links
Bayside City Council Website

Suburbs of Melbourne
Suburbs of the City of Bayside